The Ministry of Justice of Burundi performs tasks such as the following:

 Promote judicial cooperation and training and inspect any related institutions
 Educate litigants by disseminating legal information and providing translation if necessary
 Ensure human rights and ministerial collaboration
 Monitor cases that are gender-based or minor-related violations

The following administrations are under the leadership of the Ministry of Justice:

 General Directorate of Penitentiary Affairs
 Directorate of the Conservation of Land Titles
 Center for Studies and Legal Documentation
 Professional Training Center of Justice 
 National Service of Legislation

List of ministers (Post-1962 upon achieving independence) 

 Claver Nuwinkware (1961–1964)
Pierre Ngunzu (1964–1965)
Artémon Simbananiye (1965–1972)
Albert Shibura (1973–1975) [referred to as Minister of Interior and Justice]
Philippe Minani (1975–1976)
Jean-Baptiste Manwangari (1977–1978)
Laurent Nzeyimana (1979–1982)
Vincent Ndikumasabo (1983–1986)
Aloys Ndenzako (1987)
Evariste Niyonkuro (1988–1991)
 Sebastian Ntahuga (1992–1993)
 Fulgence Dwima-Bakana (1994)
 Melchior Ntahobama (1994–1995)
 Gerard Ngendaganya (1996)
 Gervais Rubashamuheto (1997)
 Thérence Sinunguruza (1998– 2001)
 Fulgence Dwima Bakana (2002–2003)
 Didace Kiganahe (2004-2005)
 Clotilde Niragira (2005-2007) [1st female]
 Laurent Nzeyimana (2007-2009)
 Ancille Ntakaburimvo (2010–2011)
 Pascal Barandagiye (2011–2015)
 Aimée Laurentine Kanyana (2015–present)

See also 

 Justice ministry
 Politics of Burundi

References 

Justice ministries
Government of Burundi
Justice ministers of Burundi